Povrazník is a village and municipality in Banská Bystrica District in the Banská Bystrica Region of central Slovakia.

History
In historical records the village was first mentioned in 1424.

Geography
The municipality lies at an altitude of 650 metres and covers an area of 3.345 km². It has a population of about 137 people.

References

External links
 http://www.povraznik.sk/

Villages and municipalities in Banská Bystrica District